Kimberichnus is an ichnofossil associated with the early bilaterian Kimberella. It is known mostly from shallow marine Ediacaran sediments, often occurring alongside its producer. Kimberichnus often occurs in Russia and South Australia, where it is most abundant in the shape of multiple arcuate sets of ridges with fan-shaped arrangements.

Description 

Kimberichnus traces often occur alongside the death masks of Kimberella; the traces represent possibly the oldest known evidence of trace fossils that are associated with a bilaterian maker. The traces occur in the Ediacaran sediments of the Russian White Sea and in South Australia, Kimberichnus was described from Russia. They most often occur as simple arcuate ridges arranged in sets, with an arrangement similar to that of fans; it is thought that these traces came from Kimberella rasping the microbial mat underneath it with its teethed Proboscis

The feeding patterns that are seen in these traces exclude any Arthropodal origin, they instead point to a creator that was most likely systematically excavating nutrients/food off of the microbial mats. Even though organisms at the time would move over the traces and slightly disturb them, it would not disturb them to the point that they will get deformed; this is because of the multiple layers of Microbes that made up the mats . The occurrence of both the traces maker and the trace itself in the Ediacaran period supports claims that bilaterians were already globally distributed and were able to make traces of grazing.

Theoretical importance 

A sudden event around starting around  had a huge influx of animal diversity in body plans that was named the Cambrian explosion. The rapid event finished before . Some mid-19th century scientists already knew about some Early Cambrian fossils, Charles Darwin noticed this sudden diversification of body plans and proposed that it could be a counter-argument against his theory of evolution.

Kimberichnus seems to indicate an important step in this revolution of animals. Kimberella apparently grazed on the mats underneath its proboscis, and would often leave the Kimberichnus trace; it is also sometimes similar to Radulichnus from other Geological periods. It seems that, because Kimberichnus is the trace produced by a Radula or teeth, Kimberella may have been an early (or relative of) Mollusc. It is important to note that Radulae very rarely get preserved.

See also 
Kimberella
List of Ediacaran genera

References 

Ediacaran
Ediacaran life
Trace fossils
Fossil taxa described in 2013